The 2015 K League Classic was the 33rd season of the top division of South Korean professional football, and the third season of the K League Classic.

Teams

General information

Stadiums

Managerial changes

Foreign players
Restricting the number of foreign players strictly to four per team, including a slot for a player from AFC countries. A team could use four foreign players on the field each game including a least one player from the AFC country. Players name in bold indicates the player is registered during the mid-season transfer window.

League table

Positions by matchday

Round 1–33

Round 34–38

Results

Matches 1–22 
Teams play each other twice, once at home, once away.

Matches 23–33

Matches 34–38
After 33 matches, the league splits into two sections of six teams each, with teams playing every other team in their section once (either at home or away). The exact matches are determined upon the league table at the time of the split.

Group A

Group B

Relegation playoffs

Player statistics

Top scorers

Source:

Top assist providers

Source:

Awards

Main awards 
The 2015 K League Awards was held on 1 December 2015.

Source:

Best XI 

Source:

Player of the Round 

Source:

Manager of the Month 

Source:

Attendance

Attendance by club
Attendants who entered with free ticket are not counted.

Top matches

See also
2015 in South Korean football
2015 K League Challenge
2015 Korean FA Cup

References

External links
Official website 
Review at K League 
RSSSF

K League Classic seasons
1
South Korea
South Korea